The 2011 Lamar Hunt U.S. Open Cup was the 98th edition of the USSF's annual national soccer championship, running from June through early October. Seattle Sounders FC, who entered the competition as the two-time defending champions, successfully defended their title again.  They became the third team in U.S. Open Cup history to win three straight U.S. Open Cups (the others being Stix, Baer and Fuller/St. Louis Central Breweries from 1933 to 1935 and Greek American AA from 1967 to 1969 — this excludes the run of Fall River Marksmen in 1930 and 1931, as the team that won in 1932, New Bedford Whalers, was the result of mergers of teams that included Fall River). As winner of the Open Cup, the Sounders earned a place in the 2012–13 CONCACAF Champions League Group Stage (the preliminary round will be eliminated from the CONCACAF Champions League starting from 2012–13).  The farthest advancing USL Pro team was the Richmond Kickers.

Like the previous edition, the Open Cup featured 40 clubs from across the five tiers of the American soccer pyramid. This season, due to late provisional sanctioning, the North American Soccer League was not allowed to send its clubs to the tournament. The event featured eight clubs from Major League Soccer, with six automatically qualifying based on their league position in the 2010 season and two qualifying through a play-in tournament. They entered the tournament in the third round. All 11 USL Pro League clubs based in the United States, nine clubs from the USL Premier Development League, four clubs from the National Premier Soccer League, and eight United States Adult Soccer Association qualifiers began play in the first round.

Dates

Participating teams

The tournament consisted of 40 teams, according to the following distribution:

Major League Soccer (8 teams)
Chicago Fire
Columbus Crew
FC Dallas
Los Angeles Galaxy
New York Red Bulls
Real Salt Lake
Seattle Sounders FC
Sporting Kansas City

North American Soccer League (0 teams)
On February 17, 2011, the USSF announced that no NASL teams will be participating in the competition since the league did not obtain provisional sanctioning in time.

USL Pro League (11 teams)
Charleston Battery
Charlotte Eagles
Dayton Dutch Lions
Harrisburg City Islanders
Los Angeles Blues
F.C. New York
Orlando City
Pittsburgh Riverhounds
Richmond Kickers
Rochester Rhinos
Wilmington Hammerheads

Premier Development League (9 teams)
Carolina Dynamo
Central Florida Kraze
Chicago Fire Premier
Chivas El Paso Patriots
Kitsap Pumas
Reading United
Real Colorado Foxes
Ventura County Fusion
Western Mass Pioneers

National Premier Soccer League (4 teams)
Brooklyn Italians
Chattanooga FC
Hollywood United Hitmen
Madison 56ers

USASA (8 teams)
A.A.C. Eagles
Doxa Italia
DV8 Defenders
Iowa Menace
ASC New Stars
New York Pancyprian-Freedoms
Phoenix SC
Regals FC

Open Cup Bracket

Home teams listed on top of bracket.  (AET): After Extra Time

Schedule
Note: Scorelines use the standard U.S. convention of placing the home team on the right-hand side of box scores.

First round

Second round

Third round

Quarterfinals

Semifinals

Final

Top scorers
Statistics current as of 4 October 2011

References

External links
 TheCup.us – Match reports and results
 

 
2011
2011 in American soccer
2011 domestic association football cups
2012–13 CONCACAF Champions League